The Skoki Formation is a stratigraphic unit of Early to Middle Ordovician age that is present on the western edge of the Western Canada Sedimentary Basin in the Canadian Rockies of Alberta and British Columbia. It was named for Skoki Mountain near Lake Louise in Banff National Park by Charles Doolittle Walcott in 1928. The Skoki Formation is fossiliferous and includes remains of brachiopods and other marine invertebrates, as well as conodonts and oncolites.

Lithology and deposition
The Skoki Formation formed as a shallow marine shelf along the western shoreline of the North American Craton during Early to Middle Ordovician time. Most of the original limestone was subsequently altered to dolomite. Many beds include quartz sand and silt, and some include layers of brown argillite.

Distribution and stratigraphic relationships
The Skoki is present in the Canadian Rockies of Alberta and British Columbia. It reaches a thickness of up to 186 metres (610 ft) in the southern Rockies and about 500 metres (1800 ft) in the northern Rockies. It conformably overlies the Outram Formation or the Tipperary Quartzite, depending on the location, and underlies the Owen Creek Formation.

Paleontology
The Skoki Formation contains several genera of brachiopods, as well as gastropods, conodonts, cephalopods, trilobites, echinoderms, stromatolites, corals, and oncolites.

References

 

Western Canadian Sedimentary Basin
Ordovician Alberta
Paleontology in Alberta
Geologic formations of Alberta
Geologic formations of Canada
Dolomite formations
Limestone formations
Ordovician southern paleotropical deposits